Wolfgang Amadeus Mozart's Piano Sonata No. 17 in B major, K. 570, dated February 1789, is a sonata in three movements:

A typical performance takes about 18 minutes.

There is an accompanying violin part of doubtful origin in many 1800 editions; the piano part is exactly the same as for piano solo.

References

External links
 
  (Alte Mozart-Ausgabe version)
 

Piano Sonata 17
1789 compositions
Compositions in B-flat major